Álvaro Peña may refer to:
Álvaro Peña (Bolivian footballer) (born 1965)
Álvaro Peña (Uruguayan footballer) (born 1989)
Álvaro Peña (Spanish footballer) (born 1991)